The City and County of Swansea Council, or simply Swansea Council, is the local authority for the city and county of Swansea, one of the principal areas of Wales. The principal area also includes rural areas to the north of the built-up area of Swansea and the Gower Peninsula to the west. The council consists of 75 councillors representing 32 electoral wards.

Since 2012 the council has been controlled by the Labour Party.

History

Swansea was an ancient borough. The town's first charter was granted sometime between 1158 and 1184 by William de Newburgh, 3rd Earl of Warwick. The charter granted the townsmen (called burgesses) certain rights to develop the area. A second charter was granted in 1215 by King John. The borough was reformed under the Municipal Corporations Act 1835 to become a municipal borough.

When elected county councils were established in 1889 under the Local Government Act 1888, Swansea was considered large enough to run its own county-level services, and so it  became a county borough, independent from Glamorgan County Council. Swansea County Borough Council was the local authority from 1889 until 1974. It gained city status in 1969, allowing the council to call itself Swansea City Council.

In 1974, under the Local Government Act 1972, Swansea became a lower-tier district council, with the new West Glamorgan County Council providing county-level services. The district of Swansea created in 1974 was larger than the old county borough, also covering the area of the abolished Gower Rural District. In 1996, under the Local Government (Wales) Act 1994, further local government reform saw West Glamorgan County Council abolished and the district of Swansea merged with parts of the Lliw Valley district to form a unitary authority, called the 'City and County of Swansea' (.)

Political control
The first election to the new council was held in 1995, initially operating as a shadow authority before coming into its powers on 1 April 1996. Political control of the council since 1996 has been held by the following parties:

Leadership
The first leader of the council following the reforms in 1996, Tom Jones, was the last leader of West Glamorgan County Council. The leaders of Swansea Council since 1996 have been:

Current composition
As at 5 May 2022:

Party with majority control in bold.

Elections
Since 2012, elections have taken place every five years. The last election was 5 May 2022.

Party with the most elected councillors in bold. Coalition agreements in notes column.

Between 1996 and 2004, the council was under Labour control. Between 2004 and 2012 there was no overall control and the council was led by a coalition of the Liberal Democrats, Independents and the Conservatives, termed the Swansea Administration. Labour regained control of the council at the 2012 election and retained control at the 2017 and 2022 elections.

Mayoralty

The Lord Mayor of Swansea (Welsh: Arglwydd Faer Abertawe) is a senior member of the elected Council. Swansea has had a Mayor since it became a borough in 1835. The dignity of Lord Mayor was conferred on the city by Queen Elizabeth II on 22 March 1982 to celebrate the wedding of Charles, Prince of Wales. The status was confirmed on 1 April 1996 when the Unitary Authority of the City and County of Swansea came into being.

The style of the Lord Mayor is "The Right Worshipful the Lord Mayor of Swansea". The official residence is the Mansion House in Ffynone, which was originally built as the home of a previous mayor, Evan Matthew Richards. It was purchased by the then County Borough of Swansea in 1922 and renamed the Mansion House.

Lord Mayors of Swansea

Electoral divisions

Following a local government boundary review, the number of wards in Swansea was reduced from 36 to 32. The changes took effect from the 2022 local elections. The boundaries of 15 wards remained unchanged, but a number of other wards were merged, or radically altered, with new wards such as Mumbles and Waterfront created.

The following table lists the post-2022 county/community wards, the numbers of councillors elected and the communities they cover. Communities with a community council are indicated with a '*':

* = Communities which elect a community council
c = Ward coterminous with community of the same name

Corporate identity

Logo
The logo of the City and County of Swansea depicts a stylised Osprey.  It is shown with the name of the council written beneath it or beside it, both in Welsh (Cyngor Abertawe) and English (Swansea Council). An older version of the logo displayed the text written in a ring around the Osprey pictogram.

Coat of arms
The official coat of arms used by the council today were granted by the College of Arms in 1922.  The motto is 'Floreat Swansea'.

The Arms are blazoned as follows:
Per Fess wavy Azure and barry wavy of six Argent, of the first a double-towered Castle or, in Chief on an Inescutcheon of the third a Lion passant guardant Gules; And for the Crest, On a Wreath of the Colours an Osprey rising holding in the Beak a Fish proper; Supporters: on the dexter side a Lion Gules gorged with a Mural Crown or, and on the sinister side a Dragon Gules gorged with a Mural Crown or'.

The Arms are symbolic to an extent: the blue and white wavy bars represent the sea, since Swansea is a port town; the Castle represents the Medieval fortifications of the Town;  the lion as dexter supporter and on the Inescutcheon commemorates the link with the de Breos family; and the dragon as sinister supporter is the National Emblem of Wales and is a supporter in the Achievement of Arms of the present Lord Swansea.

In April 1974, the City of Swansea was merged with the Gower Rural District to form the new District and City of Swansea.  The Arms granted to the Corporation of the County Borough of Swansea in 1922 were transferred unchanged to the new City Council in May 1975.  The Certificate of Transfer of the College of Arms dated 11 March 1976 confirmed the re-granting of the Arms. With the 1996 reorganisation of local government, the arms were transferred a second time to the present City Council.

Council premises

Civic Centre, formerly West Glamorgan County Hall
Guildhall
Mansion House
Palace Theatre, Swansea

See also
List of parliamentary constituencies in West Glamorgan

References

External links
 
 City and County of Swansea: Council Constitution

Politics of Swansea
Swansea
1996 establishments in Wales